The Gambia is subdivided into 43 districts.  They are listed below by Local Government Area (previously Regions, known as Divisions until 2007), each with its population at the 15 April 2013 census (provisional returns).
 
The former Banjul Region is now divided into two Local Government Areas (LGAs) - Banjul City (which is now subdivided into 3 districts) and Kanifing (consisting of a single district).

The former Central River Division is now divided into two LGAs - Kuntaur LGA in the west and Janjanbureh LGA in the east.

Each of the other former Divisions has now become an LGA with no change in extent (although each was renamed after its administrative centre).

Eastern Gambia

Basse LGA

(previously the Upper River Division)

Basse Fulladu East (49,990)
Jimara (43,460)
Kantora (38,784)
Sandu (23,884)
Tumana (37,561)
Wuli East (23,691)
Wuli West (22,546)

Janjanbureh LGA

(the southern half of the former Central River Division)

Fulladu West (84,961)
Janjanbureh (3,988)
Niamina Dankunku (6,097)
Niamina East (24,571)
Niamina West (7,293)

Kuntaur LGA
(the northern half of the former Central River Division)
Lower Saloum (15,881)
Niani (29,478)
Nianija (10,175)
Sami (24,429)
Upper Saloum (19,145)

Western Gambia

Banjul LGA

This Local Government Area encompasses the City of Banjul, consisting of the island of that name (previously called St Mary's Island).

Banjul Central (11,697)
Banjul North (11,334)
Banjul South (8,270)

Kanifing LGA
This district is the mainland extension of Banjul City, comprising the majority of Greater Banjul. It's coloured yellow on the map above.

Kanifing (382,096)

Brikama LGA

(previously the Western Division)

Foni Bintang-Karenai (16,986)
Foni Bondali (7,741)
Foni Brefet (14,414)
Foni Jarrol (7,010)
Foni Kansala (14,238)
Kombo Central (142,831)
Kombo East (42,955)
Kombo North	(344,756)
Kombo South (108,773)

Kerewan LGA

(previously the North Bank Division)

Central Baddibu (20,104)
Illiasa (41,603)
Jokadu (22,132)
Lower Baddibu (18,030)
Lower Niumi (57,358)
Sabach Sanjal (30,347)
Upper Niumi (31,480)

Mansakonko LGA

(previously the Lower River Division)

Jarra Central (8,437)
Jarra East (16,551)
Jarra West (27,205)
Kiang Central (8,366)
Kiang East (6,849)
Kiang West (14,953)

See also 

 Politics of the Gambia

References

External links 
 http://www.statoids.com/ygm.html
 http://www.oldmap.co.uk/Africa.html 

 
Subdivisions of the Gambia
Gambia, Districts
Gambia 2
Districts, Gambia
Districts